William Thomas Roberts (29 November 1898 – 13 October 1965) was an English professional footballer who played for Soho Villa, Leicester Fosse, Preston North End, Burnley, Tottenham Hotspur, Dick, Kerr's, Chorley and England at international level.

Football career 
Roberts began his career at non League Soho Villa and later Leicester Fosse. 

After World War I he joined Preston North End and made his debut against Blackburn Rovers in 1919. The high scoring centre forward was top scorer in his first season with 29 goals. Roberts featured in 199 matches and scored 118 goals between 1919–1924. 

In 1924 he signed for Burnley where he scored a further 28 goals in 49 matches. 

He returned to Deepdale for his second spell at the club in 1926 and once again top scored with 30 goals in 55 matches. 

Roberts broke an arm in a motor vehicle accident in 1927  and suffered injury problems before joining Tottenham Hotspur in 1928. 
He scored twice on his Lilywhites debut in a 4-1 victory over Oldham Athletic at White Hart Lane in August 1928 in the old Second Division. He made three more appearances, but never found the net again for the Spurs. 

After leaving London Roberts played for the Dick, Kerr's XI and finally ended his playing career at Chorley.

International career 
Roberts played twice for England. His first match was against Belgium in November 1923 and played in the following game against Wales. He scored in both matches but was never capped again.

After football 
Roberts worked as a publican for 30 years in the Preston area.

References 

1898 births
1965 deaths
Footballers from Birmingham, West Midlands
English footballers
England international footballers
Association football forwards
Leicester City F.C. players
Preston North End F.C. players
Burnley F.C. players
Tottenham Hotspur F.C. players
Dick, Kerr's F.C. players
Chorley F.C. players
English Football League players
English Football League representative players
Footballers from Handsworth, West Midlands